Liposcelis deltachi is a species of booklouse in the family Liposcelididae. It is found in Central America and North America.

References

Liposcelis
Articles created by Qbugbot
Insects described in 1957